The Last Men of the Revolution is a compilation of biographies written by Rev. E. B. Hillard (Elias Brewster) documenting six of some of the last living veterans of the American Revolution who were alive in 1864.  The book contains six albumen prints, one for each veteran documented excluding James Barham.



List of interviewees 

 James Barham (1764–1865) served in the Virginia Militia. He was a resident of Greene County, Missouri. His photograph and biography can be found at the James Barham Find a grave Website

Edward Everett's letter 

On January 15, 1865, Edward Everett, former Governor of Massachusetts, wrote a letter to the publishers N. A. & R. A. Moore expressing his appreciation for their book. The letter was written the day he died and is his last known letter. Soon after the letter was written it was in possession of Mr. James Parker, of Springfield Ma., an antiquary and collector of autographs. He had the letter lithographed and made copies of the book with the letter's facsimile in the front, copies were given to his friends.

Edwards Everett's letter:

References

1864 non-fiction books
American biographies